The Naval Aircraft Factory XOSN was an American biplane observation floatplane developed by the Naval Aircraft Factory for the United States Navy during the late 1930s.

Design and development
In 1936, the Navy asked all interested aircraft manufacturers to submit bids for a new observation-scout aircraft, capable of operating from either water or land, but primarily intended for service on battleships and cruisers for gunnery spotting. 

Three companies – Stearman Aircraft, Vought and the Naval Aircraft Factory - submitted aircraft to meet the requirements. The Naval Aircraft Factory design, assigned the designation XOSN-1, was a two-seat biplane of mixed metal and fabric construction, with the pilot and observer seated in tandem in a fully enclosed cockpit. Innovations included automatic leading-edge slats on the upper wing and an I-strut bracing system that eliminated the need for interplane bracing wires. Provisions were made for either float or wheeled landing gear of a conventional taildragger type.

Operational history
The XOSN-1 was delivered for official trials in May 1938 and evaluated along with the other entrants. After Vought's monoplane XOS2U-1 was selected for production, the XOSN-1 was assigned to the Naval Academy at Annapolis where it was used as a trainer until mid-1944.

Operators

United States Navy

Specifications (XOSN-1)

See also

References
Citations

1930s United States military reconnaissance aircraft
Single-engined tractor aircraft
Biplanes
Floatplanes
Aircraft first flown in 1938
XOS1N